Apiocera barri is a species of fly in the family Apioceridae.

References

Asiloidea
Articles created by Qbugbot
Insects described in 1982